Every Breath may refer
"Every Breath", a song by Tracy Bonham from her 1996 album The Burdens of Being Upright.
Every Breath, a 1994 film starring Judd Nelson and Joanna Pacuła.
"Every Breath", a song by Boyce Avenue from their 2010 album "All We Have Left"